Eugène Béjot (31 August 1867 – 28 February 1931) was a French etcher.

Biography 
Béjot was born in Paris and studied there at the Académie Julian. He learnt to etch with Henri-Gabriel Ibels in 1891. Béjot's technical skills were already apparent in his 1892 first commissioned series, La Seine a Paris. He then firmly established his reputation with his widely acclaimed La Samaritaine, which was exhibited at the Peintres-Graveurs exhibition in Paris in 1893.

Béjot's work is inextricably linked to Paris. He made many etchings of the Seine, as well as of the quays and buildings of Paris. His delicate use of light evokes the city's atmosphere.

Béjot was very highly regarded in England. In 1908, he was elected to the Royal Society of Painter-Etchers and Engravers in London. He also became a Chevalier of the Legion of Honour in 1912. He died in Paris in 1931.

Gallery

References

Further reading
Grove Dictionary of Art, ed. Jane Turner (1996), article by Etrenne Lymberg, vol. 3, pp. 522–523.
Benezit Dictionary of Artists, Gründ, 2006, vol. 2, p. 45.
L’Oeuvre gravée d’Eugène Béjot, Paris: J. Laren, 1937.

19th-century French painters
French male painters
20th-century French painters
20th-century French male artists
19th-century French male artists
Chevaliers of the Légion d'honneur
1867 births
1931 deaths
French etchers
Académie Julian alumni
Painters from Paris
20th-century French printmakers